Pien Dicke (born 28 August 1999) is a field hockey player from the Netherlands, who plays as a forward.

Personal life
Pien Dicke was born and raised in The Hague, Netherlands.

During her freshman year of university, Dicke studied at the University of Virginia.

Career

Club hockey
In the Dutch Hoofdklasse, Dicke plays club hockey for SCHC.

National teams

Under–18
Pien Dicke made her debut in Netherlands colours in 2016, as part of the Under–18 team at the EuroHockey Youth Championship in Cork, Ireland.

Under–21
In 2019, Dicke made her second appearance for a Dutch team with the Under–21 team at the EuroHockey Junior Championship in Valencia, Spain. Dicke scored four goals throughout the tournament, helping the team to a silver medal after losing the final in a penalty shoot-out against Spain.

Oranje Dames
In 2019, Dicke was named in the Netherlands senior squad for the first time, and is set to make her debut in 2020.

References

External links
 
 

1999 births
Living people
Female field hockey forwards
Field hockey players from The Hague